KIFI-TV (channel 8) is a television station licensed to Idaho Falls, Idaho, United States, serving the Idaho Falls–Pocatello market as an affiliate of ABC, CBS, The CW Plus and Telemundo. It is owned by the News-Press & Gazette Company (NPG), which provides certain services to dual Dabl/Fox affiliate KIDK (channel 3, also licensed to Idaho Falls) under a shared services agreement (SSA) with VistaWest Media, LLC. Both stations share studios on North Yellowstone Highway/US 26 in Idaho Falls, while KIFI-TV's transmitter is located on East Butte in unincorporated northern Bingham county along the Idaho National Laboratory border.

History

KIFI-TV went on the air in January 1961 as eastern Idaho's second television station. It was owned by the Brady family and the Post Company alongside the area's leading newspaper, The Post Register, and KIFI radio (AM 1260, now KNBL). It was a primary NBC affiliate, and shared a secondary ABC affiliation with then KID-TV. At 316,000 watts, KIFI was the most powerful television station in Idaho. In 1962, KIFI aired the first live remote basketball telecast in Idaho from Reed Gym at Idaho State University in Pocatello.

In 1965, KIFI was the first station in Idaho to install a color film chain (16mm and 35mm color slides). In 1968, KIFI broadcast the first live telecast from the Eastern Idaho State Fair in Blackfoot with weatherman Lloyd Lindsey Young. In January 1996, KIFI-TV switched from NBC to ABC, swapping with longtime ABC affiliate KPVI (channel 6) after that station was sold to Sunbelt Broadcasting. Before the switch, NYPD Blue was not cleared at all in the Pocatello market, as KPVI opted to preempt it due to its vulgar language.

The Bradys sold off the radio station in 1963, but retained channel 8 until selling it to News-Press & Gazette in 2005. The station was branded as "Idaho 8" for a number of years, before being branded Local News 8 in early 1999. In 2008, KIFI launched "WiNG" (Wireless Internet Newsgathering), becoming the first station in the United States to execute live shots using WiMAX technology. In December 2010, it was announced that KIFI had entered into a shared services agreement with Fisher Communications-owned KIDK and would operate the CBS affiliate out of the KIFI facility.

In December 2020, NPG bought the non-license assets of KIDK from VistaWest Media, a sister company of NPG that purchased KIDK in 2013. As part of the deal, on New Year's Day 2021 the KIDK intellectual unit moved to KIFI's second digital subchannel, with Telemundo moving to the fifth subchannel.

Programming

Syndicated programming
Syndicated programming on KIFI-DT1 includes Family Feud, The Ellen DeGeneres Show and Live with Kelly and Ryan among others. Syndicated programming on KIFI-DT2 includes Two and a Half Men, The Big Bang Theory, The Doctors, and Dr. Phil among others.

News operation
KIFI operates its news department out of its Idaho Falls facility, with a news bureau that operates in Pocatello on Yellowstone Avenue. On March 1, 2009, KIFI became the area's first television station to upgrade local newscast production to high definition. As a result of the SSA between KIFI and KIDK, the latter consolidated its news department into KIFI's studios. KIFI then began producing all of KIDK's newscasts (including a nightly prime time show seen on KXPI).

KIDK modified its local news schedule in order to reduce opportunities for direct competition with KIFI and because the station only has one studio. More specifically, KIDK dropped its weekday morning show in favor of CBS Morning News repeats making that station one of a few in the United States that does not provide a local broadcast in the time slot. Separate newscasts airing weeknights at 5 and 6 on KIDK were dropped in favor of one seen at 5:30 while KIFI airs ABC World News Tonight. KIDK provides the CBS Evening News at 5 preceding its local show. That station still offers a separate broadcast weeknights at 10 that does compete with KIFI.

All local news programming produced for KIDK originates from KIFI's primary set except with modified studio elements, such as duratrans and on-screen graphics, indicating the specific channel airing news. In order to maintain individual on-air identities and branding, KIFI and KIDK have separate graphic schemes and news music packages. The two maintain primary personalities during the week (such as news anchors) that only appear on one channel. The primary anchors will appear on competing stations during major breaking news simulcasts, like the 2012 Charlotte Fire. On weekends, KIFI offers its own early evening newscast at 5 while KIDK follows at 5:30. The two television outlets simulcast together at 10 although the broadcast can be delayed or preempted on one channel due to network obligations. Like all CW Plus stations, KIFI-DT3 aired the nationally syndicated morning show The Daily Buzz on weekdays until its cancellation on April 15, 2015.

Technical information

Subchannels
The station's digital signal is multiplexed:

It is currently broadcasting in a 720p format. As of September 7, 2009, KIFI added The CW on its third digital subchannel. As of January 1, 2021, KIFI added CBS on its second digital subchannel and moved Telemundo to its fifth subchannel.

Analog-to-digital conversion
KIFI-TV shut down its analog signal, over VHF channel 8, on June 12, 2009, the official date in which full-power television stations in the United States transitioned from analog to digital broadcasts under federal mandate. The station's digital signal relocated from its pre-transition VHF channel 9 to channel 8 for post-transition operations.

Translators

References
Museum of Idaho

External links

ABC network affiliates
CBS network affiliates
Telemundo network affiliates
Television channels and stations established in 1961
News-Press & Gazette Company
IFI-TV
1961 establishments in Idaho